Gomanj and Gamanj, also rendered as Komanj or Komanch or Kamanj may refer to:
 Gomanj-e Olya
 Gomanj-e Sofla